Luca Ferretti (born 6 March 1983) is an Italian former footballer who played as a forward.

Career

Early career
Born in Montecchio Emilia, Emilia-Romagna, Ferretti started his career at Parma, located at Parma, Emilia-Romagna.

In June 2003, Milan swapped their youth products with Parma, which Davide Favaro, Marco Donadel and Mirko Stefani left for Parma and Milan got Ferretti, Roberto Massaro and Filippo Porcari, all were co-ownership deal. The deals were fined in 2009 due to the clubs inflated the price of players to gain false profit show in balance sheet.

Lega Pro
Ferretti was immediately loaned to Serie C1 for Reggiana but in mid-season left for Legnano of Serie C2. At the end of season, Parma got all registration rights from Milan.

In the next season, he left for Aglianese where he played 32 league matches.

In 2005, he was signed by San Marino Calcio. But after played 3 league matches, he quit professional football.

In August 2008, he signed a 1-year contract with Lecco.

References

External links

Italian footballers
Parma Calcio 1913 players
A.C. Reggiana 1919 players
A.C. Legnano players
A.S.D. Victor San Marino players
Calcio Lecco 1912 players
Association football forwards
Sportspeople from the Province of Reggio Emilia
1983 births
Living people
Italian male long-distance swimmers
Footballers from Emilia-Romagna